Kellie Wells is an American professor of English, novelist, and short story writer.

Life
Kellie Wells graduated from the University of Kansas with a BS in Journalism and a BA in English. She received MFAs from the University of Montana and the University of Pittsburgh, and a PhD from Western Michigan University. 
Previously the director of the graduate writing program at Washington University in St. Louis, Wells now teaches at the University of Alabama, where she is also a member of the advisory board for The Tusculum Review. She also teaches in the low-residency MFA program at Pacific University. She is currently teaching and directing at the MFA program at The University of Alabama.

Her work has appeared in The Kenyon Review, The Gettysburg Review, Prairie Schooner, Ninth Letter, and Fairy Tale Review among others.

Awards
 2001 Flannery O'Connor Award for Short Fiction
 2002 Rona Jaffe Foundation Writers' Award
 2002 Great Lakes Colleges Association New Writers Award
 2014 Baltic Writing Residency
 2016 Sullivan Prize in Short Fiction

Works

Anthologies

References

External links

"An Interview with Kellie Wells," Tusculum Review
"Short Story Month--Secession, XX, by Kellie Wells," Emerging Writers' Network
"Interview with Kellie Wells, Author of Fat Girl, Terrestrial"

1962 births
Living people
University of Kansas alumni
University of Montana alumni
Western Michigan University alumni
Washington University in St. Louis faculty
Rona Jaffe Foundation Writers' Award winners
21st-century American novelists
American women short story writers
American women novelists
21st-century American women writers
21st-century American short story writers
Novelists from Missouri
Writers from Kansas City, Kansas